Sentiment may refer to:

Feelings, and emotions
Public opinion, also called sentiment
Sentimentality, an appeal to shallow, uncomplicated emotions at the expense of reason
Sentimental novel, an 18th-century literary genre
Market sentiment, optimism or pessimism in financial and commodity markets
Sentiment analysis, automatic detection of opinions embodied in text
News sentiment, automatic detection of opinions embodied in news
Sentiment (film), a 2003 Czech drama film
Sentiments (album), Sahib Sahib